The Grand Orange Lodge of British America, more commonly known as the Grand Orange Lodge of Canada or simply Orange Order in Canada, is the Canadian branch of the Orange Order, a Protestant fraternal organization that began in County Armagh in Ireland in 1795. It has played a large part in the history of Canada, with many prominent members including four prime ministers, among them Sir John A. Macdonald and John Diefenbaker.

Upper Canada and the Province of Canada

The Orange Lodges have existed in Canada at least since the War of 1812. The first Lodge was established in Montreal by William Burton, Arthur Hopper, John Dyer, Francis Abbott and several others.  William Burton travelled to Ireland to obtain the warrant to open the Lodge from the Grand Lodge of Ireland and became the first Grand Master of the Montreal Lodge.  In the following years Arthur Hopper was elected the next Grand Master and given the power of granting warrants to subordinate Lodges under the Great Seal of the Grand Lodge of Ireland.  The first such Lodge was granted to Robert Birch of Richmond.  The Order was more formally organized in 1830 when Ogle Robert Gowan established the Grand Orange Lodge of British North America in the Upper Canada town of Elizabethtown, which became Brockville in 1832 (according to the plaque outside the original lodge in Brockville, Ontario). Gowan immigrated from Ireland in 1829, and became the Grand Master of the Grand Orange Lodge of British North America.  His father was the grand master of the Irish Orange Order. Most early members were from Ireland, but later many Scots, English and other Protestant Europeans joined the Order, Jews in addition to Amerindians, such as those in the Mohawk Orange Lodge which survives into the present day.

Fraternal organization 
The Order was the chief social institution in Upper Canada, organizing many community and benevolent activities, and helping Protestant immigrants to settle. It remained a predominant political force in southern Ontario well into the twentieth century. There were scores of socially prominent citizens who were granted honorary membership but did not actually participate in official lodge business. Surprisingly given its great prestige, although there were many members drawn from the upper and middle classes, lodge membership was predominantly drawn from the ranks of labourers, street railway workers, teamsters, and other elements of the working class. Besides sentimental patriotic or imperialist motivations, many Orangemen joined because the benefits of mutual aid, security, and health supports made it easier to survive the difficulties of working-class life. Middle-class members, such as professionals, small-shop owners, and tavern-keepers, saw membership in terms of commercial gain through the steady attraction of lodge members as clientele. The Order’s secrecy, solemn oaths, and masonic-type rituals bonded men together as part of a greater whole, and dressing in the order’s distinctive sash and regalia for the Twelfth of July parade let members show off their status and achievements to the greater community. The Grand Orange Lodge of British America Benefit Fund was established in 1881 to provide fraternal benefits to members and remains as a modern insurance system.

Protestant ascendency and politics in Toronto 
The Grand Orange Lodge of British America was established in Toronto in 1830, and it expanded steadily so that there were over 20 lodges in 1860, 31 in 1880, and 56 by 1895. At the turn of the century Toronto was nicknamed "The Belfast of Canada". Historian Hereward Senior has noted that the Orange Order’s political ideal was expressed in the word “ascendancy.”
"This meant, in effect, control of the volunteer militia, of much of the machinery of local government, and substantial influence with the Dublin administration. Above all, it meant the ability to exert pressure on magistrates and juries, which gave Orangemen a degree of immunity from the law. Their means of securing ascendancy had been the Orange lodges which provided links between Irish Protestants of all classes. This ascendancy often meant political power for Protestant gentlemen and a special status for Protestant peasants." In the context of Toronto, such ascendancy was sought through the Corporation (as the administration of the city of Toronto was known). By 1844, six of Toronto’s ten aldermen were Orangemen, and over the rest of the nineteenth century twenty of twenty-three mayors would be as well.

Electoral riots 
“Ascendancy,” or control of this legal and political machinery, gave the Orange Order a monopoly on the use of “legitimate” violence. Between 1839 and 1866, the Orange Order was involved in 29 riots in Toronto, of which 16 had direct political inspiration.

Province of Alberta
Historian William Baergen notes that White Anglo Saxon Protestantism (WASP) was a foundational feature of the early settlement in Alberta. He notes that as immigrants from non-Anglo-Saxon regions of Europe entered the province in greater numbers between 1921 and 1931 that there was a corresponding rise in "Anglo-Saxon racism, anti-Catholicism and immigrant phobia". Baergen says that "the more radical white Anglo-Saxon Protestants were represented by the Orange Order, and formed the essence of the anti-Catholic and anti-foreigner agenda that emerged in Alberta during the period from 1929–1933. Baergen notes that "Wherever the dominance of the British way appeared threatened, an Orange Lodge could be expected to appear."

In a letter to Alberta Premier John Edward Brownlee on December 13, 1927, the Hesketh Loyal Orange Lodge, No. 3013 congratulated the premier on his stand restricting immigration to the province, saying "By unanimous vote of the members of this lodge... I have been instructed to write and congratulate you on your stand re THE EMIGRATION POLICY and its ADMINISTRATION [sic]"

Control of 'the Corporation' 
The Orange Order became a central facet of life in many parts of Canada, especially in the business centre of Toronto where many deals and relationships were forged at the lodge. Toronto politics, especially on the municipal level, were almost wholly dominated by the Orange Order. An influential weekly newspaper, The Sentinel, promoted Protestant social and political views and was widely circulated throughout North America. At its height in 1942, 16 of the 23 members of city council were members of the Orange Order. Every mayor of Toronto in the first half of the twentieth century was an Orangeman. This continued until the 1954 election when the Jewish Nathan Phillips defeated staunch Orange leader Leslie Howard Saunders.

Ottawa
The Orangemen, members of the various Ottawa, Westboro and Billings Bridge Lodges as well as lodges from outlying towns paraded from the Orange Hall, Gloucester Street to St. Matthew's Anglican Church (Ottawa) on July 10, 1938.

In the rest of British America 
The Orange Lodge was a centre for community activity in Newfoundland. For example, in 1903 Sir William Coaker founded the Fisherman's Protective Union (FPU) in an Orange Hall in Herring Neck. Furthermore, during the term of Commission of Government (1934–1949), the Orange Lodge was one of only a handful of "democratic" organizations that existed in the Dominion of Newfoundland.  It supported Newfoundland's confederation with Canada in reaction to Catholic bishops' support for self-government.

The Orange Order was also a force in New Brunswick, such that riots surrounding Orange marches occurred in the 1840s (a period of Irish mass immigration) in New Brunswick.  Even tiny Woodstock, New Brunswick, experienced a riot in 1847 on The Twelfth (July 12, the anniversary of the Battle of the Boyne), near a now-vanished Orange Hall at the corner of Victoria and Boyne streets.  The height of conflict was a riot in Saint John, New Brunswick, on July 12, 1849, in which at least 12 people died. The violence subsided as Irish immigration declined, though even in 1884, 3 were killed in Harbour Grace, Newfoundland in the "usual" "collision" "between Orangemen and Roman Catholics".

After 1945, the Canadian Orange Order rapidly declined in membership and political influence. The development of the welfare state made its fraternal society functions less important. A more important cause of the decline was the secularization of Canadian society: with fewer Canadians attending churches of any sort, the old division between Protestant and Catholic seemed less relevant. Perhaps even more important was the decline of the British Empire and consequently the reduced value of maintaining the 'British Connection' which had always underpinned the Order. The Twelfth remains a provincial holiday in the province of Newfoundland and Labrador under the name Orangeman's Day.

Orangemen and war

Orangemen played a big part in suppressing the Upper Canada Rebellion of William Lyon Mackenzie in 1837.  Though the rebellion was short-lived, 317 Orangemen were sworn into the local militia by the Mayor of Toronto and then resisted Mackenzie's march down Yonge Street in 1837.

They were involved in resisting the Fenians at the Battle of Ridgeway in 1866. An obelisk there marks the spot where Orangemen died in defending the colony against an attack by members of Clan na Gael (commonly known as Fenians).

Orangemen in western Canada helped suppress the rebellions of Louis Riel in 1870 and 1885.  The killing of abducted Orangeman Thomas Scott was a turning point in the 1870 Red River Rebellion which caused the Dominion government to launch the Wolseley expedition to restore order. The first Orange warrant in Manitoba and the North-West Territories was carried by a member of this expedition.

In 1913, the Orange Association of Manitoba volunteered a regiment to fight with the Ulster Volunteers against British forces if Home Rule were to be introduced to Ireland.

Prominent members

Four members of the Orange Order have been prime ministers of Canada, namely Sir John A. Macdonald, the father of Canadian Confederation, Sir John Abbott, Sir Mackenzie Bowell (a past Grand Master), and John Diefenbaker, in addition to many Ontario premiers.

Possibly influenced by the number of Irish Newfoundlanders, the majority of whom were Roman Catholic, several of the diplomats who negotiated the Terms of Union between Newfoundland and Canada in 1947 were members of the Orange Order: Joseph Smallwood, P.W. Crummey (a past Newfoundland grand master) and F.G. Bradley (a past Newfoundland grand master). In fact, the Orange Order played an important role in bringing Newfoundland into Confederation.

Edward Frederick Clarke, a prominent editor and publisher, served as a member of the Legislative Assembly of Ontario from 1886 to 1904 and as a Member of Parliament from 1896 to 1905.

Orangeman Alexander James Muir (Ontario) wrote both the music and lyrics to the Canadian patriotic song "The Maple Leaf Forever" in 1867. The song was considered for the role of national anthem in the 1960s.

Angus Walters was the skipper of the Bluenose.

The 17th governor general, Lord Alexander of Tunis was reputedly a member of the Orange Order as noted by the Grand Orange Lodge of British America, although the source reference notes that he was born in Ulster, which is incorrect.

Until the late 1960s, almost all mayors of Toronto were Orangemen with William Dennison being the last Orangeman to serve in office (1967-1972).

Hockey Hall of Fame inductee George Dudley was an Orangeman, and served 43 years as Midland, Ontario's town solicitor.

See also 
Orange Order
Royal Black Preceptory
The Loyal True Blue and Orange Home
 Anti-Quebec sentiment

Notes

References 
Monographs
 Wilson, David A. The Orange Order in Canada, Four Courts Press, 2007, 213 p.  (preview)
 Akenson, Donald H. The Orangeman: The Life & Times of Ogle Gowan, James Lorimer & Company, 1986, 330 p.  (preview)
 Pennefather, R. S. The Orange and the Black. Documents in the History of the Orange Order. Ontario and the West, 1890-1940, Orange and Black Publications, 1984, 187 p.
 Houston, Cecil J., and William J. Smyth. The Sash Canada Wore: A Historical Geography of the Orange Order in Canada. Toronto: University of Toronto Press, 1980, 215 p. 
 Saunders, Leslie Howard. An Orangeman in Public Life: The Memoirs of Leslie Howard Saunders, Britannia Printers, 1980, 230 p.
 Senior, Hereward. Orangeism: The Canadian Phase, McGraw-Hill Ryerson, 1972, 107 p. 
 Bull, William Perkins. From the Boyne to Brampton : or, John the Orangeman at home and abroad, Toronto: Perkins Bull Foundation, 1936, 365 p. (online)
 Gowan, Ogle Robert. Orangeism; Its Origin and History, Toronto: Lovell and Gibson, 354 p. (online)
Pierre-Luc Bégin  (2008). « Loyalisme et fanatisme », Petite histoire du mouvement orangiste canadien, Les Éditions du Québécois, 2008, 200 pp..
Luc Bouvier, (2002).  « Les sacrifiés de la bonne entente » Histoire des francophones du Pontiac, Éditions de l’Action nationale.

Articles
 O'Connor, Ryan. "“…you can beat us in the House of Assembly, but you can’t beat us in the street”: The Symbolic Value of Charlottetown’s Orange Lodge Riot", in CCHA Historical Studies (Volume 72, 2006), pp. 71–94.]
 Johnston A. J. B. "Popery and Progress: Anti-Catholicism in Mid-Nineteenth-Century Nova Scotia", in Dalhousie Review, Vol. 64, No 1 (1984): p. 146-163.
 See, Scott W., "The Orange Order and Social Violence in Mid-Nineteenth Century Saint John", in Acadiensis, Vol. 13, No 1 (autumn 1983): p. 68-92.
 Wallace, W. Stewart, ed., "Orange Association of British North America", in The Encyclopedia of Canada, Vol. V, Toronto, University Associates of Canada, 1948, 401p., pp. 60–61.

Thesis
 Strauch, Timothy Edgard. Walking for God and Raising Hell. The Jubilee Riots, The Orange Order and the Preservation of Protestantism in Toronto, 1875, Queen's University, Kingston, Ontario, April 1999 (online)

External links 
Grand Orange Lodge of Canada
Orange Chronicle
Brampton LOL 5
Grand Orange Lodge of Western Canada
Orillia Harmony Loyal Orange Lodge №296
Canadian Orange Historical Site
Loyalty Beyond Borders

Canada, Orange Order
Protestantism in Canada
Irish diaspora in Canada
Sectarian violence
Ulster-Scottish Canadian culture
Clubs and societies in Canada